Infinite Paths to Infinite Reality: Sri Ramakrishna & Cross-Cultural Philosophy of Religion is a book by Ayon Maharaj on Sri Ramakrishna and the philosophy of religion.
The book was published in the US and UK in 2018 in hardcover. An Indian hardcover edition was published in 2019. The book has been reviewed in professional and popular journals, and in 2021 was the focus of a fourteen-article book symposium in the International Journal of Hindu Studies.

The book's author holds a doctorate in philosophy from the University of California, Berkeley. At the time of the book's original publication, the author was known as Ayon Maharaj, was a professor at Ramakrishna Mission Vivekananda University, and was a monk-in-training. He subsequently became a fully ordained monk with the name Swami Medhananda. He explained in his 2021 book symposium reply that "Prior to 2010, I published under my premonastic name 'Ayon Roy.' Since joining the Ramakrishna Order in 2010, I have published under the name 'Ayon Maharaj.' In February 2020, I was ordained into Sannyāsa and given the name 'Swami Medhananda,' so I am now publishing under my new name."

Topics covered
Infinite Paths contains four major parts, each containing two chapters, giving a total of eight chapters.

In Infinite Paths, Maharaj argues that "Ramakrishna's spiritual standpoint of vijnana holds the key to understanding his nuanced position on religious diversity".

Reception
Reviews have appeared in Philosophy East and West, Notre Dame Philosophical Reviews, The Indian Express, and Reading Religion, and the Journal of Hindu-Christian Studies. The book is the focus of a book review symposium published in the International Journal of Hindu Studies (2021, volume 25, pp. 55-164), that included thirteen scholarly commentaries on Infinite Paths, followed by a reply from the book's author (Swami Medhananda, formerly Ayon Maharaj).

In Philosophy East and West, religious studies scholar Jeffery D. Long stated that

In Notre Dame Philosophical Reviews, Samta Pandya of the Tata Institute of Social Sciences described Infinite Paths as "combin[ing] detailed exegesis with cross-cultural philosophical investigation". and as having "a broad interdisciplinary appeal... a good reference for scholars of religious studies, Hindu studies, and comparative theology".

In The Indian Express, Pratap Bhanu Mehta, Vice-Chancellor of Ashoka University, characterized Infinite Paths as "a pathbreaking work... philosophically astute, textually scrupulous, and [an] imaginatively subtle reconstruction of Ramakrishna Paramhansa's teachings". Mehta views Infinite Paths as treating [Ramakrishna] as a "philosopher of unusual depth and consistency", and as defending

In Reading Religion, published by the American Academy of Religion, Swami Narasimhananda stated that "Maharaj has given the world of religious literature a historically important work that situates Sri Ramakrishna as a philosopher in his own right. Maharaj’s work brings home the urgency to actively engage with Indian thought that is often hidden in the precepts of saints and mystics." The Swami, who is editor of Prabuddha Bharata, noted that previous "academic engagements with [Sri Ramakrishna's]... precepts have been negligible."  He suggested that "The task that Maharaj has set before himself is daunting," and reported that in analyzing Sri Ramakrishna's teachings through five interpretive principles, Maharaj

The International Journal of Hindu Studies published a book review symposium on Infinite Paths to Infinite Reality in its issue of August 2021 (volume 25, numbers 1-2). The symposium contained separate commentaries by Jonathan C. Gold, Jeffery D. Long, Jonathan B. Edelmann, Michael S. Allen, Benedikt Paul Göcke, Perry Schmidt-Leukel, Francis X. Clooney, Christopher J. Bartley, Amiya P. Sen, Ethan Mills, Arvind Sharma, Julius Lipner, and Michael Williams, followed by a reply by the book's author, Swami Medhananda (formerly known as Ayon Maharaj).
As part of Medhananda's response to the 13 commentators on his book, he contextualized his book as follows:

Editions
The original edition was published in hardcover by in 2018 by Oxford University Press. An Indian hardcover edition was published in 2019.

See also
Unifying Hinduism (book by Andrew Nicholson)

References

External links
 Talk by Ayon Maharaj about chapter three of Infinite Paths  (1:22:27 on YouTube, 27 November 2018 at Princeton University, introduced by Andrew Nicholson) (1:23:31, alternate version) 
Talk by Ayon Maharaj about chapter one of Infinite Paths (1:31:39 on YouTube, 28 November 2018 at Vedanta Society of New York) 

2018 non-fiction books
Vedanta
Ramakrishna
Oxford University Press books